Raphaël Horace Dubois (20 June 1849, Le Mans – 21 January 1929) was a French pharmacologist known for his work on bioluminescence and anesthesia.  He coined the terms proteon and bioproteon, from the Greek "proteon" for matter and "bios" for life. Bioproteon means "living matter".  He concluded that there was no difference between matter and living matter.

Dubois' bioluminescence work began when he became a research assistant to Paul Bert in 1882. While initially planning to study the effects of anesthesia on mollusks, witnessing the bioluminescence of Pyrophorus noctilucus inspired him to study the beetle more in depth. Dubois discovered that not only do the adults glow, but so do the unfertilized eggs, embryo, and larvae. Dubois later conducted studies on Scolioplanes crassipes, wherein Dubois discovered the source of its luminescence is in cells of the wall of the gut. Dubois published a paper studying the light production of Pholas dactylus in 1887, in which he coined the terms luciferin and luciferase.

References

1849 births
1929 deaths
Bioluminescence
French pharmacologists
People from Le Mans